Church Lake Water Aerodrome  is located adjacent to Church Lake, Nova Scotia, Canada.

References

Registered aerodromes in Nova Scotia
Transport in Lunenburg County, Nova Scotia
Buildings and structures in Lunenburg County, Nova Scotia
Seaplane bases in Nova Scotia